Innsbruck Hauptbahnhof (German for Innsbruck Main Station or Central Station) is the main railway station in Innsbruck, the capital city of the Austrian federal state of Tyrol.  Opened in 1853, the station is a major hub for western and central Austria. In 2019, it was the 8th-busiest station in the country, and the 2nd-busiest outside of Vienna after only Linz Hauptbahnhof, with 315 train movements and 38,500 passengers daily.

The station is owned and operated by ÖBB. It forms the junction of the Arlberg Railway to Bregenz, Brenner Railway to Italy, Mittenwald Railway to Germany's region of Ällgau, Stubaitalbahn and the main east–west artery Lower Inn Valley Railway.

Location
Innsbruck Hauptbahnhof is located at Südtiroler Platz. It is at the southeastern side of the city centre and a 10-minute walk away.

History
The planning of a railway line in the region of Tyrol began in 1850 under the Austrian Empire. Three years later, Emperor Franz Joseph I approved the route from Innsbruck to Wörgl across the Inn Valley. In 1854, the line is extended to the border city, Kufstein, close to the Kingdom of Bavaria. Franz Czwerwenka, head of the civil construction department, designed the railway station as one of the most beautiful station buildings within the Austrian Empire.

Innsbruck station opened along with the line to Kufstein. In 1867, the station then assumed greater importance upon the commissioning of the Brenner Railway (then part of the Southern Railway crossing the Alps at 1,371 metres above sea into South Tyrol) and, in 1883, the Arlberg Railway (reaching the westernmost of modern-day Austria).Innsbruck West railway station was created for the Arlberg Railway.
By the 1880s, due to the heavy train traffic over the Brenner Pass, the original station had become too small to accommodate passengers and freight; therefore, the station building and train shed were rebuilt on the same site.

Transfer to ÖBB
On 1 January 1924, ÖBB took over all railway lines of the Austrian Southern Railway. In 1927, the station was once again rebuilt to enhance its capacity. The departure hall was frescoed by Rudolf Stolz; the platforms were connected with a subway underneath and the train shed was replaced by platform roofs. At the same time, the Operations Directorate moved into the "Clock Tower Building" (so called due to a small clock tower at the top) in the station's north wing.

By the end of World War II, the station was completely destroyed by Allied bombings. An ÖBB architect later combined various designs of other well-known architects to create a plain, functional replacement station building in the style of the 1950s. In 1954, the Austrian artist Max Weiler was awarded the contract for the design of a large departure hall. His design, however, has attracted controversy, as he chose a pair of murals on display to represent Innsbruck's heritage.

In 1997, the ÖBB launched Bahnhofsoffensive, a scheme to reconstruct existing railway stations within Austria. Innsbruck Hauptbhanhof received a new design by the architects of Riegler Riewe. The groundbreaking ceremony took place in 2001 and the new station was officially open on 19 May 2004. ÖBB renovated the 1920s clock tower in the north wing for housing a police station.

Station building

The central component of the present station building is the main hall, which extends through to the basement, with access to the platforms through two tunnels (north tunnel and south tunnel). There is also access from the main hall to the underground parking station (and then, via another pedestrian tunnel, to the Hotel Europa and escalators to the bus and tram terminals), and, via an additional pedestrian tunnel, to the bus station and local shops. On its northern side, the station building adjoins an office building.

The striking frescoes by Max Weiler, together with a few centimetres of underlying masonry, were removed from the 1950s station building in one piece and remounted in the new concourse.

Almost simultaneously with the construction of the new station building, a public transport hub was created in the station forecourt, which is paved with a red-colored asphalt (and nicknamed "Red Square"). The new hub serves the Innsbruck tramway network, regional and urban bus lines, and the narrow gauge Stubai Valley Railway. At the time it was created, a rail junction was built at the southern end of the square for a proposed new tram route towards the south, but construction of the new route itself was deferred.

Other facilities

The station has eight through tracks. Of these, platform 1 is accessible at ground level as "home platform", and platform 8 is accessible from the East (only) for loading cars onto motorail trains.

Additionally, there are four bay platforms (platforms 21–22, 31 and 41), for regional passenger traffic via the Mittenwald railway, the Arlberg railway and the Brenner railway.

The Hauptbahnhof complex includes the Frachtenbahnhof Innsbruck, which, amongst other facilities, lost much of its importance when the Innsbruck goods train bypass (Inntaltunnel) was completed in 1994.  It now stands to be partially transformed in the course of urban development into a residential area.

The shunting yard of the Innsbruck railway junction is located at Hall in Tirol.

Services

Significance
The station is important for commuter traffic to and from the Tyrolean provincial capital, and in providing a hub function for east–west traffic ((Budapest) – Vienna – Salzburg – Wörgl – Innsbruck (Zürich) / Bregenz) and north–south traffic (Munich – Wörgl – Innsbruck – Bolzano – Verona – (Milan / Venice / Rome )).

In Wörgl Hauptbahnhof, the railway line divides into a northern branch via Kufstein to Salzburg and Munich, and an eastern branch via Zell am See to Salzburg, Graz and Klagenfurt (Gisela Railway).

Rail services
The following services call at this station (incomplete):

Domestic

 Intercity train (ÖBB Railjet 'RJ' / Intercity) Innsbruck-Salzburg: Innsbruck - Jenbach - Wörgl - Kufstein - Salzburg
 Intercity train (ÖBB Railjet 'RJ' / Intercity) Zürich-Vienna: Zürich - Feldkirch - St. Anton am Arlberg - Landeck-Zams - Imst-Pitztal - Ötztal - Innsbruck - Jenbach - Wörgl - Kufstein - Salzburg - Linz - St. Pölten - Vienna
 Intercity train (ÖBB Railjet 'RJ' / Intercity) Innsbruck-Bregenz: Innsbruck - Ötztal - Imst-Pitztal - Landeck-Zams - St. Anton am Arlberg - Feldkirch - Bregenz
 Metre-gauge train (Stubaitalbahn) Innsbruck-Fulpmes: Innsbruck - Fulpmes

Domestic and Germany/South Tyrol

(D for Germany, I for Italy)

 Intercity train (ÖBB Eurocity) Munich-Innsbruck: Munich (D) - Rosenheim (D) - Kufstein - Wörgl - Jenbach - Innsbruck
 Intercity train (DB Intercity Express 'ICE') Munich-Innsbruck: Munich (D) - Garmish-Partenkirchen (D) - Mittenwald (D) - Seefeld-in-Tirol - Innsbruck
 Regional train (ÖBB Regional-Express 'REX') Innsbruck-Mittenwald: Innsbruck - Seefeld-in-Tirol - Mittenwald (D)
 Regional train (Südtirol Bahn Regional-Express 'REX') Innsbruck-Bozen: Innsbruck - Matrei-am-Brenner - Brenner/Brennero (I) - Franzensfeste/Fortezza (I) - Bozen/Bolzano (I)

Cross-border (Night train)

(CH for Switzerland, D for Germany, H for Hungary, F for France, I for Italy, PL for Poland, BR for Belarus, R for Russia, CZ for Czech Republic, SLO for Slovenia, HR for Croatia, SEB for Serbia)

On 11 December, ÖBB will take over all night trains of Deutsch Bahn and rebrand EuroNight services as "Nightjet".

 Night train (ÖBB EuroNight) Budapest-Zürich: Budapest (H) - Györ (H) - Vienna - St Pölten - Linz - Salzburg - Innsbruck - Feldkirch - Buchs SG (CH) - Sargans (CH) - Zürich (CH)
Night train (DB CityNightLine) Munich-Milan/Rome: Munich (D) - Rosenheim (D) - Kufstein - Wörgl - Jenbach - Innsbruck - Bozen/Bolzano (I) - Verona^ (I) - Perschiera del Garda (I) - Brescia (I) - Milan (I)
 Night train (ÖBB EuroNight) Feldkirch-Zagreb: Feldkirch - St. Anton am Arlberg - Landeck-Zams - Innsbruck - Jenbach - Wörgl - Bad Hofgastein - Bad Gastein - Villach - Jesenice (SLO) - Ljubljana (SLO) - Zagreb (HR)

^ Train connects at Verona with ÖBB EuroNight Vienna-Rome

From 11 December, a new service Düsseldorf-Innsbruck will be operated by ÖBB:
 Night train (ÖBB Nightjet) Hamburg/Düsseldorf-Innsbruck/Vienna: Düsseldorf (D) - Frankfurt (D) - Nuremberg/Nürnberg (D) (train connects with Hamburg-Nürnberg-Wien) - Munich/München (D) - Innsbruck

Cross-border
 Intercity train (ÖBB EuroCity) Munich-Verona/Venice: Munich (D) - Rosenheim (D) - Kufstein - Wörgl - Jenbach - Innsbruck - Brenner/Brennero (I) - Franzensfeste/Fortezza (I) - Brixen/Bressanone (I) - Bozen/Bolzano (I) - Trient/Trento (I) - Rofreit/Rovereto (I) - Verona (I) - (Padova (I)) - (Venice (I))
 Intercity train (ÖBB EuroCity) Munich-Verona/Bologna: Munich (D) - Rosenheim (D) - Kufstein - Wörgl - Jenbach - Innsbruck - Brenner/Brennero (I) - Franzensfeste/Fortezza (I) - Brixen/Bressanone (I) - Bozen/Bolzano (I) - Trient/Trento (I) - Rofreit/Rovereto (I) - Verona (I) - (Bologna (I))
 Intercity Train (RZD EuroNight) Moscow-Nice: Moscow (Belorusskaja) (R) - Wjasma (R) - Smolensk (R) - Orscha Central (ВR) - Minsk (BR) - Brest Central (BR) - Terespol (PL) - Warsaw West (Wschodnia) (PL) - Warsaw Central (Centralna) (PL)- Katowice (PL) - Zebrzydowice (PL) - Bohumin (CZ) - Breclav (CZ) - Vienna/Wien - Linz-Donau - Innsbuck - Bozen/Bolzano (I) - Verona (I) - Milan (I) - Genova/Genoa (I) - San Remo (I) - Ventimiglia (I) - Menton (F) - Monaco Monte-Carlo (MN) - Nice (F) 
 Tourist train (Venice-Simplon Orient Express) Venice-London: Venice (I) or Rome (I) - Verona (I) - Innsbruck - Munich (D) - Paris (F) - London (GB)

Tyrol S-Bahn
Line 1: Landeck-Zams - Imst-Pitztal -  Ötztal - Telfs - Innsbruck - Hall-in-Tirol - Jenbach - Wörgl - Kufstein - (Rosenheim)
Line 2: Landeck-Zams - Imst-Pitztal -  Ötztal - Telfs - Innsbruck - Hall-in-Tirol - Jenbach
Line 3: Hall-in-Tirol - Innsbruck - Steinach-am-Brenner
Line 4: Brenner - Gries-am-Brenner - Steinach-am-Brenner - Matrei-am-Brenner - Innsbruck - (Völs)
Line 5: Innsbruck - Seefeld-in-Tirol
Line 6: Scharnitz - Kufstein

Bus services 
Innsbruck Hauptbahnhof is the hub of IVB, the bus and tram operator of Innsbruck. Most of the lines have a stop at Hauptbahnhof. With the bus line F, the station is connected to Innsbruck Airport. From the station forecourt there are departing not only city lines but also regional lines to different destinations in all directions.

See also 

History of rail transport in Austria
Rail transport in Austria

References

This article is based upon a translation of the German-language version as at July 2011

External links

History and pictures of Innsbruck Hauptbahnhof 

Railway stations in Tyrol (state)
Buildings and structures in Innsbruck
Transport in Innsbruck
1853 establishments in the Austrian Empire
Railway stations opened in 1853
Railway stations in Austria opened in 1853
Railway stations in Austria opened in the 19th century